The 2009 Chivas USA season was the fifth season of the team's existence. It began on March 21 with a 2-1 home win over the Colorado Rapids, and ended with a 3-2 aggregate loss to the Los Angeles Galaxy in the first round of the playoffs.

Season review

Transfers

In

Out

Roster

Management

North American SuperLiga

Competitions

MLS

League table

Results summary

Results

MLS Cup Playoffs

U.S. Open Cup

Statistics

Appearances and goals

|-
|colspan="14"|Players away from Chivas USA on loan:
|-
|colspan="14"|Players who left Chivas USA during the season:

|}

Goal scorers

Disciplinary Record

References

External links 
2009 Schedule

Chivas USA seasons
Chivas USA
Chivas USA
Chivas USA